Nomada texana is a species of bee native to the southern and western United States and other parts of North America (including Mexico).

Description
Nomada texana males measure from 7.5 to 8.0 mm, and females measure at around 8–9 mm. These bees are primarily black with yellow markings and reddish legs.

References

texana
Insects described in 1872